Clive Montgomery Francis Planta (August 11, 1895–April 17, 1972) was a Canadian politician. He served in the Legislative Assembly of British Columbia from 1933 to 1937 from the electoral district of Peace River, a non-partisan Independent member. He was the son of Canadian politician Albert Planta. Planta later served as the manager of the Fisheries Council of Canada and as Deputy Minister of Fisheries for Newfoundland.

References

1895 births
1972 deaths
Members of the Legislative Assembly of British Columbia
People from Nanaimo